Tomasz Jędrusik (born February 3, 1969 in Szczecin, Zachodniopomorskie) is a male former track and field sprinter from Poland, who represented his native country at two Summer Olympics: 1988 and 1996. He set his personal best (45.27) in the men's 400 metres event in 1988.

Competition record

References

 sports-reference

1969 births
Living people
Sportspeople from Szczecin
Polish male sprinters
Olympic athletes of Poland
Athletes (track and field) at the 1988 Summer Olympics
Athletes (track and field) at the 1996 Summer Olympics
World Athletics Championships athletes for Poland
Zawisza Bydgoszcz athletes